Elections were held in Perth County, Ontario on October 27, 2014 in conjunction with municipal elections across the province.

Perth County Council
Perth County Council consists of 10 members and uses a weighted voting method so that member's votes match the populations of the constituent communities.

North Perth

Perth East

Perth South

West Perth

References

Perth
Perth County, Ontario